Agriocnemis femina, the variable wisp or pinhead wisp,
is a species of damselfly in the family Coenagrionidae. 
It is a small damselfly; mature males have a white pruinescence over their body, and a dark tail.
It is found from India, through South-east Asia to islands in the Pacific.
where it inhabits pools and stagnant water.

Gallery

References 

 http://animaldiversity.org/accounts/Agriocnemis_femina/classification/

Coenagrionidae
Odonata of Asia
Odonata of Oceania
Insects of India
Insects of Sri Lanka
Insects of Vietnam
Insects of Thailand
Taxa named by Friedrich Moritz Brauer
Insects described in 1868
Damselflies